Nordmaling is a locality and the seat of Nordmaling Municipality in Västerbotten County, Sweden with 2,546 inhabitants in 2010.

References 

Populated places in Västerbotten County
Populated places in Nordmaling Municipality
Municipal seats of Västerbotten County
Swedish municipal seats